Harry Specters is an Ely, Cambridgeshire-based chocolatier established with the express purpose of providing employment and free work experience for autistic individuals. It was founded by Mona and Shaz Shah in 2012; the Shahs themselves have an autistic son. The name Harry Specters was their son's idea when he was 14 years old. When asked how he came up with the name, he said it "...came from my head". After working with many autistic young people, the company believes that autistic people can be very intuitive. They are very loyal, have great attention to detail and love to be social. 60% of the company's profits are reserved for social goals.

Harry Specter's products received one Three-Star rating and two One-Star awards in the Guild of Fine Food's Great Taste Awards for 2014. As well, the Guardian ranked their chocolate Easter egg as the best chocolate made by a social enterprise in 2014.

References

Chocolateries
British companies established in 2012
Food and drink companies established in 2012
Retail companies established in 2012
Shops in the United Kingdom